30 Squadron or 30th Squadron may refer to:

 No. 30 Squadron RAAF, a unit of the Australian Royal Air Force
 No. 30 Squadron (Finland), a unit of the Finnish Air Force
 No. 30 Squadron RNZAF, a unit of the New Zealand Royal Air Force
 No. 30 Squadron RAF, a unit of the United Kingdom Royal Air Force
 30th Reconnaissance Squadron, a unit of the United States Air Force